A cricket field is a large grass field on which the game of cricket is played. Although generally oval in shape, there is a wide variety within this: some are almost perfect circles, some elongated ovals and some entirely irregular shapes with little or no symmetry – but they will have entirely curved boundaries, almost without exception. Cricket is unusual among major sports (along with golf, Australian rules football and baseball) in that there is no official rule for a fixed-shape ground for professional games. On most grounds, a rope demarcates the perimeter of the field and is known as the boundary.

Within the boundary and generally as close to the centre as possible will be the square which is an area of carefully prepared grass upon which cricket pitches can be prepared and marked for the matches. The pitch is where batsmen hit the bowled ball and run between the wickets to score runs, while the fielding team tries to return the ball to either wicket to prevent this.

Field size

The ICC Standard Playing Conditions define the minimum and maximum size of the playing surface for international matches. Law 19.1.3 of ICC Men's Test Match Playing Conditions as well as ICC Men's One Day International Playing Conditions states: 19.1.3 The aim shall be to maximise the size of the playing area at each venue.

In addition, the conditions require a minimum three-yard gap between the "rope" and the surrounding fencing or advertising boards. This allows players to dive without risk of injury.

The conditions contain a grandfather clause, which exempts stadiums built before October 2007. However, most stadiums which regularly host international games easily meet the minimum dimensions.

Nevertheless, Stadium Australia which hosted the Sydney Olympics in 2000 had its running track turfed over with 30,000 seats removed to make it possible to play cricket there, at a cost of A$80 million. This is one of the reasons cricket games generally cannot be hosted outside the traditional cricket-playing countries, and a few non-Test nations like Canada, the UAE and Kenya that have built Test standard stadiums.

Pitch

Most of the action takes place in the centre of this ground, on a rectangular clay strip usually with short grass called the pitch. The pitch measures  (1 chain) long.

At each end of the pitch three upright wooden stakes, called the stumps, are hammered into the ground. Two wooden crosspieces, known as the bails, sit in grooves atop the stumps, linking each to its neighbour. Each set of three stumps and two bails is collectively known as a wicket. One end of the pitch is designated the batting end where the batsman stands and the other is designated the bowling end where the bowler runs in to bowl. The area of the field on the side of the line joining the wickets where the batsman holds his bat (the right-hand side for a right-handed batsman, the left for a left-hander) is known as the off side, the other as the leg side or on side.

Lines drawn or painted on the pitch are known as creases. Creases are used to adjudicate the dismissals of batsmen, by indicating where the batsmen's grounds are, and to determine whether a delivery is fair.

Parts of the field
For limited overs cricket matches, there are two additional field markings to define areas relating to fielding restrictions. The "circle" or "fielding circle" is an oval described by drawing a semicircle of  radius from the centre of each wicket with respect to the breadth of the pitch and joining them with lines parallel,  to the length of the pitch. This divides the field into an infield and outfield and can be marked by a painted line or evenly spaced discs. The close-infield is defined by a circle of radius , centred at middle stump guard on the popping crease at the end of the wicket, and is often marked by dots.

See also
List of Test cricket grounds

References

Cricket captaincy and tactics
Cricket laws and regulations

Sports venues by type
Cricket